Zankl is a surname. Notable people with the surname include:

Angelo Zankl (1901–2007), American monk and centenarian
Karl Zankl (died 1945), Austrian footballer and manager